Elk Run and Elkrun may refer to:

Elk Run (West Branch Fishing Creek), a stream in Pennsylvania
Elk Run, Virginia, an unincorporated community in Fauquier County
Elkrun Township, Columbiana County, Ohio

See also
Elk Run Heights, Iowa, a city in Black Hawk County
Elk Run Junction, West Virginia, an unincorporated community in Boone County
Elk's Run, a comic book